Cyprian Kizito Lwanga (19 January 1953 – 3 April 2021) was a Ugandan  Roman Catholic Prelate who served as Archbishop of Kampala from 2006 to his death. From 1996 to 2006, he served as Bishop of Kasana–Luweero.

Background and education
Lwanga was born on 19 January 1953 at Kyabakadde Village, in Naggalama Parish, in present-day Mukono District in the Buganda Region of Uganda, within the Diocese of Lugazi.

Lwanga attended Kyabakadde Primary School. He entered Nyenga Seminary in 1964. Between 1972 and 1974, he studied at Katigondo National Major Seminary, in present-day Kalungu District. He then studied Theology at Ggaba National Seminary, in Kampala. In 1979, he joined the University of Clermont-Ferrand in France, where he studied administration and languages, with particular emphasis on administration. Later, he studied at Pontifical University of the Holy Cross in Rome, where in 1994, he earned a doctorate in Canon Law.

Priest
Lwanga was ordained a priest on 8 April 1978 at Rubaga Cathedral by Cardinal Emmanuel Kiwanuka Nsubuga. He served as a priest of Kampala Archdiocese until 30 November 1996.

Bishop
Lwanga was appointed first bishop of the Diocese of Kasana-Luweero on 30 November 1996 and consecrated bishop on 1 March 1997 at Kasana-Luweero, by Cardinal Emmanuel Wamala, Archbishop of Kampala, assisted by Bishop Joseph Bernard Louis Willigers, Bishop of Jinja and Bishop Paul Lokiru Kalanda, Bishop of Fort Portal.

On 19 August 2006, Lwanga was appointed the third Archbishop of the Archdiocese of Kampala and was installed as the third Archbishop of Kampala on 30 September 2006 at Rubaga Cathedral, succeeding Cardinal Emmanuel Wamala, who resigned.

On 2 February 2020, Lwanga issued a decree that Catholics in the archdiocese of Kampala could only receive Holy Communion on the tongue and not on the hand.

Death
In his last public appearance on Good Friday 2 April 2021 during the way of the cross he criticized the violations of human rights in Uganda, fueling rumors of him being poisoned. Lwanga was found dead in his house on 3 April 2021. Before and after the elections of 14 January, Lwanga has repeatedly expressed fear of being killed.

See also
 Joseph Kiwanuka
 Uganda Martyrs
 Roman Catholicism in Uganda

References

External links
Over 13 Catholic Bishops For 18th Plenary Assembly
Archbishop Lwanga Excites Guests
Lwanga Preaches Humility
End Corruption & Brutalty

1953 births
2021 deaths
21st-century Roman Catholic archbishops in Uganda
20th-century Roman Catholic bishops in Uganda
People from Mukono District
University of Clermont-Ferrand alumni
Pontifical University of the Holy Cross alumni
Roman Catholic bishops of Kasana–Luweero
Roman Catholic archbishops of Kampala